Þorsteins saga Víkingssonar or The Saga of Thorstein, Viking's Son is a legendary saga which takes place in the 7th century. It is about the father of Frithjof the Bold. It begins in Norway and Sweden (with locations such as Ulleråker), but continues into exotic places such as India. It is not one of the more famous sagas, but it is still considered to be an entertaining story. It is a prequel to Friðþjófs saga ins frœkna, The Saga of Fridthjof the Bold.

It has been compared to the runestone Sö 54 in Bjudby, Södermanland, Sweden, as it also mentions a prominent family, and besides the father Víkingr it names three sons with the same names as in the saga, and there are also close correspondences with the other names.

Plot
In Sweden, Viking sires nine sons by a second wife. Thorsten (Thorstein, or Thor's Stone) is the oldest son of Viking. Viking befriends his worthy foe Njorfe, King of Upplands, in Norway, who also has nine sons. The two groups of sons are highly competitive against each other. In a brutal ball game, they beat and maim each other, breaking each other's arms. A son of Viking, near death, slays a son of Njorfe.

Viking scolds this son and sends him to an island in Lake Vänern. Two more sons go with him, including Thorsten. Viking tells Thorsten to wait quietly on the island until the danger is over. Njorfe's sons want revenge. They use magic to conjure a frost that freezes the lake and travel across it to attack the three sons of Viking. Two of Viking's sons survive: Thorsten and Thorer. Two of Njorfe's sons survive, including his eldest son, Jokul, a sorcerer. Njorfe's sons use magic to discover that Thorsten and Thorer are alive.

Viking sends his two sons to the court of Halfdan for safety. Jokul invades Sogn, kills the king, banishes the heir Beli, and places a curse on the king's daughter Ingeborg, causing her to take the shape of a hideous troll. Jokul stirs a tempest which shipwrecks Thorsten twice. Ingeborg (as a troll, under the name Skellinefja) rescues Thorsten and asks him to promise to marry her. With her help, Thorsten returns Beli to the throne of Sogn, and the curse leaves Ingeborg. Thorsten unites with Ingeborg. Fridthiof is their son.

Thorsten, Beli, and Angantyr retrieve Viking's stolen magic ship Ellida. Thorsten fights Sote, a ghost pirate in barow mound, to get the magic ring (forged by Voland). Thorsten, Beli, and Angantyr conquer the Orkney Islands.

Thorsten and his son Frithiof inherit the magic sword Angurvadel and the magic ship Ellida from Viking. Descendants of Thorstein appear in Friðþjófs saga ins frœkna, and in the Starkad section of Gautreks saga.

See also
Frithiof's Saga

Footnotes

References

editions
 
translations
https://web.archive.org/web/20100617003125/http://www.northvegr.org/sagas%20annd%20epics/legendary%20heroic%20and%20imaginative%20sagas/viking%20tales%20of%20the%20north/001_01.html

Fiction set in the 7th century
Legendary sagas
Sources of Norse mythology